Players and pairs who neither have high enough rankings nor receive wild cards may participate in a qualifying tournament held one week before the annual Wimbledon Tennis Championships.

Seeds

  David DiLucia /  Roger Smith (qualified)
  Fredrik Bergh /  Patrik Fredriksson (first round)
  Neville Godwin /  Bryan Shelton (first round)
  Chad Clark /  Trey Phillips (first round)
  Petr Luxa /  Radek Štěpánek (second round)
  Bill Behrens /  Chris Haggard (qualifying competition, lucky losers)

Qualifiers

  David DiLucia /  Roger Smith
  Ben Ellwood /  Peter Tramacchi
  Robbie Koenig /  Andrew Rueb

Lucky losers

  Régis Lavergne /  Stéphane Simian
  Bill Behrens /  Chris Haggard
  Henrik Holm /  Nils Holm

Qualifying draw

First qualifier

Second qualifier

Third qualifier

External links

1997 Wimbledon Championships – Men's draws and results at the International Tennis Federation

Men's Doubles Qualifying
Wimbledon Championship by year – Men's doubles qualifying